Kanagawa 16th district is a political district in northwestern Kanagawa prefecture, Japan, represented in the national government's House of Representatives.  Its constituency includes parts of Sagamihara and several other municipalities.

List of representatives

Election results

2021

2017

2014

2012

2009

2006

2005

2003

2000

References

Kanagawa Prefecture
Districts of the House of Representatives (Japan)